Teunis Nieuwoudt (born 3 December 1991) is a South African professional rugby union player for Rugby United New York in Major League Rugby. His regular position is loosehead prop.

Career
Nieuwoudt was born in East London, but grew up in Pretoria, where he attended Hoërskool Waterkloof. However, he failed to earn any provincial call-ups to represent the Blue Bulls in competitions such as the Craven Week.

He was included in their squad for the 2014 Varsity Cup, but failed to make any appearances.

He missed out on the first two rounds of action, but played in all of their remaining matches. Shimlas went through the round-robin stage of the competition with an unbeaten record to qualify for the semi-finals.

Shortly after the 2015 Varsity Cup, Nieuwoudt also joined up with the  squad that played in the 2015 Vodacom Cup. He also started their match against  a week later, but again found himself on the wrong end of a single point defeat, with the team from Kimberley winning the match 19–18.

He included a number of Shimlas players in the Free State Cheetahs squad for the 2015 Currie Cup Premier Division, with Nieuwoudt among them.

References

1991 births
Living people
Expatriate rugby union players in the United States
Free State Cheetahs players
Rugby union players from East London, Eastern Cape
Rugby union props
Rugby New York players
South African expatriate rugby union players
South African expatriate sportspeople in the United States